Smith is a hamlet in northern Alberta, Canada within the Municipal District of Lesser Slave River No. 124.

History 
The settlement of Smith began in 1914 after the Edmonton, Dunvegan and British Columbia Railway had reached the present location of the hamlet. The arrival of railway resulted in subdivision of the townsite.

Subsequently, Port Cornwall dissolved from village status on September 11, 1917.

Demographics 

See also 
List of communities in Alberta
List of designated places in Alberta
List of hamlets in Alberta

References

External links 
 Community website

Hamlets in Alberta
Designated places in Alberta
Municipal District of Lesser Slave River No. 124